Richard Keigwin may refer to:

* R. P. Keigwin (Richard Prescott Keigwin, 1883–1972), English academic and cricketer
 Richard Keigwin (Governor of Bombay) (died 1690), governor of Bombay, 1683–1684